= Shunichi Sakaguchi =

Japanese baseball player

Sakaguchi Shunichi (坂口俊一)
- Born: 5 September 1938 (age 87); Nagoya, Aichi Prefecture, Japan
- Occupation: Former professional baseball player at Chunichi Dragons
- Children: Sakaguchi Yuko

Shunichi Sakaguchi (born 5 September 1938) is a retired professional baseball player for the Chunichi Dragons. He joined the team in 1957 and took a break once in 1961 but enrolled back in 1963. He retired officially in 1963. He was an outfielder for most of his career but was most notable as a pitcher.

== Early life ==
Shunichi Sakaguchi was born in Aichi Prefecture, on 5 September 1938. He was a both a pitcher and the fourth batter in his high school baseball team. His team, Seisho High, managed to reach the finals during the summer inter school baseball tournament.

=== Professional career ===
Shunichi Sakaguchi joined Chunichi Dragons, a professional baseball team based in Nagoya, Japan in 1957. He was part of the second troop in the team and was a bench player for the first half of the year. In May 1957, he was finally able to debut when he pitched relief the main pitcher Ishikawa from the fourth inning. He threw six innings and the team managed to win for the first time in the National League. Coach Amachi, had recommended Sakaguchi to relief player Ishikawa. It is said that Sakaguchi only used "straight" and "drop" techniques for his pitching. In an interview, Director Masao Yoshida stated that Sakaguchi's pitching style was "somewhat awkward and heavy, but it was good for a drop and fast ball with a sharp curve. Ball always low and aimed at slow momentum. He puts a lot of weight on his right shoulder and waist". An ex Yokohama DeNA BayStars player said, "Sakaguchi is not a big pitcher, but it was nice to see him succeed with his low-profile fair ball." He continued for another 10 National League matches. During his career, his number positions were 49, 37, 21 and 52. Though he was initially a pitcher, he injured his shoulder mid career and had to take up the position of an outfielder. He started practicing pitching again in March 1962.

=== Personal life ===
Sakaguchi married his wife in 1965 in Nagoya, Japan. They have 2 daughters. One of which is Yuko, a former lead guitarist in the band "Coming Up Roses". The band was formed in 1989 and had played in various rock festivals in Central Park, Nagoya.
